The 1962 Washington Huskies football team was an American football team that represented the University of Washington during the 1962 NCAA University Division football season.  In its sixth season under head coach Jim Owens, the team compiled a 7–1–2 record, finished second in the Athletic Association of Western Universities, and outscored its opponents 208 to 82.

Bob Monroe and Rod Scheyer were the team captains.

Schedule

All-Coast

Professional football draft selections
Four University of Washington Huskies were selected in the 1963 NFL Draft, which lasted twenty rounds with 280 selections. Two of those Huskies were also selected in the 1963 AFL Draft, which lasted twenty-nine rounds with 232 selections.

References

External links
 Game program: Washington vs. Washington State at Spokane – November 24, 1962

Washington
Washington Huskies football seasons
Washington Huskies football